Trader may refer to:

 Merchant, retailer or one who attempts to generally buy wholesale and sell later at a profit
 The owner of a trading post, where manufactured goods were exchanged with native peoples for furs and hides.
 Trader (finance), someone who buys and sells financial instruments such as stocks, bonds, derivatives, etc.
 Trader or (speculator), someone who have the ability to detect movements that they have not caused themselves, which allows them to buy at convenient prices and then sell the assets with a margin in their favor.
 Trader Classified Media, classified advertisement company
 Trader Media East, largest classified advertising company in Central and Eastern Europe
 Trader (comics), the name of two separate fictional characters in the Marvel Comics universe
 "The Trader", a song by The Beach Boys from their album Holland
 A merchant vessel, a boat or ship that transports cargo or carries passengers for hire. This excludes pleasure craft that do not carry passengers for hire and warships

Traders 
 One of the brands under Shangri-La Hotels
 Traders (video game), a DOS video game published in 1991
 Traders (TV series) (1996–2000), Canadian drama on Global Television Network

See also 
 Trade (disambiguation)
 Trader Horn (1861–1931), ivory trader in central Africa; the subject of more than one film
 Trader Monthly, magazine for financial traders